Harcourt is a male given name which may refer to:

Harcourt Mortimer Bengough (1837–1922), British Army major general
Harcourt Burland Bull (1824–1881), Ontario (Canada) journalist and political figure
Harcourt Butler (1869–1939), British Governor of Burma
Harcourt Dowsley (1919-2014), Australian cricketer and Australian rules footballer
Harcourt Gilbey Gold (1876–1952), British rower, the first to be knighted for services to the sport
Harcourt Johnstone (1895–1945), British Liberal Party politician
Harcourt Lees (1776–1852), Irish clergyman and political pamphleteer
Harcourt Morgan (1867–1950), Canadian-American entomologist, educator, agricultural expert, and president of the University of Tennessee
Harcourt Ommundsen (1878–1915), British sport shooter
Harcourt J. Pratt (1866–1934), U.S. Representative from New York
Harcourt Templeman, British screenwriter, film producer and director of the 1930s
Harcourt Vanden-Bempde-Johnstone, 1st Baron Derwent (1829–1916), British peer and Liberal Member of Parliament
Harcourt Williams (1880–1957), English character actor

In fiction:

Harcourt Fenton Mudd aka "Harry Mudd," a roguish fictional character in several episodes of Star Trek: The Original Series, Star Trek: The Animated Series, and Star Trek: Discovery

Middle name:

Harcourt may also refer to a middle name, such as in the case of:

Lee Harcourt Montgomery (born 1961), Canadian former child actor often billed in his 1970s film (Ben) and TV appearances as Lee H. Montgomery